Fernando Miyares Pérez y Bernal (sometimes, Fernando Miyares y Gonzáles) was a Cuban Captain General, born in Santiago de Cuba, in 1749.

Military career 
Unaware that Emparán had been deposed by the municipal council of Caracas, the Spanish Council of Regency appointed Miyares as his replacement as Capitan General of Venezuela on April 29, 1810. At the time Miyares was serving as governor of Maracaibo, a post he had held since 1799. Upon receiving official notice of his new assignment, he began to organize efforts to defend Coro from military expeditions sent by the Junta of Caracas. In 1812 Frigate Captain Domingo de Monteverde arrived in Venezuela with a small force of marines. He was assigned to aid an anti-republican uprising in small towns near Coro, but managed to continue pushing deep into republican territory and enlarge his forces with locals dissatisfied with the Republic.  After gaining military strength, Monteverde refused to recognize Miyares's authority and established himself as interim captain general of the reconquered areas, something which was ratified by the Cortes of Cádizwhich served as a parliamentary Regency after Ferdinand VII was deposedwhen it temporarily split Venezuela into two captaincies general.  In 1814 Miyares was offered the Captaincy General of Guatemala, but it seems he ever assumed the post since José de Bustamante y Guerra was in office during these years. He died in his home town, Santiago de Cuba, in 1818.

See also
Royalist (Spanish American Revolutions)

References

Captains General of Venezuela
Spanish colonial governors and administrators
Cuban soldiers
Cuban military personnel
1749 births
1818 deaths